The New Zealand Building Trades Union (NZBTU) was a national trade union in New Zealand. It traced its roots back to a carpenters and joiners union in 1860.

The NZBTU had 1400 members and was a member of the New Zealand Council of Trade Unions.

External links
 NZBTU official site.

New Zealand Council of Trade Unions
Trade unions in New Zealand
Building and construction trade unions
Trade unions established in 1860